Raffin may refer to:

 Librairie Raffin, a Canadian bookstore chain
 Raffin, Sutherland, a community in Assynt, Sutherland, Highland, Scotland

People with the surname
 Deborah Raffin (1953-2012), American actress
 Luigi Raffin (born 1936), Italian footballer
 Romel Raffin (born 1954), Canadian basketball player